Live at Queen Elizabeth Hall is a live recording of Brett Anderson's 20 October 2007 concert at the Queen Elizabeth Hall, London. It comes on 2 CDs and was limited to 1500 copies. It was made available to concert-goers at the concert minutes after the conclusion of the set.

This is the third and final live recording to be released from Brett's first solo album, and was recorded at the first of two special performances at Queen Elizabeth Hall to promote the album. As well as solo material the concert concluded with acoustic and electric versions of Suede tracks.

No track-listing comes with the album.

The cover photograph of Amy Langley and Brett Anderson is by Paul Khera.

Track listing

CD 1
"To the Winter"
"Love is Dead"
"Song for my Father"
"One Lazy Morning / She's in Fashion"
"Saturday Night"
"Back to You"
"By the Sea"
"The Power"
"Asphalt World"

CD 2
"My Insatiable One / Clowns / It was a Very Good Year"
"Europe is Our Playground"
"Indian Strings"
"Everything will Flow"
"He's Gone"
"2 of Us"
"Next Life"
"Still Life"
"So Young"
"Wild Ones"
"Trash"

Brett Anderson albums
2007 live albums